Ignacio Villamor y Borbon (February 1, 1863 – May 23, 1933) was a Filipino lawyer, Associate Justice of Supreme Court from Abra, Philippines and the first Filipino president of the University of the Philippines.  Justice Villamor is also the father of the World War II Filipino aviation hero, and 6th Pursuit Squadron Commander, Capt. Jesús A. Villamor of the Philippine Army Air Corps.

Early life
Villamor was born in Bangued, Abra on February 1, 1863 to parents Florencio Villamor and Wenceslawa Borbon. His father died when he was young. Wanting to be a priest, he attended at the Seminario Conciliar of Vigan, Ilocos Sur but did not push through with the vocation.

In 1882, he studied at the San Juan de Letran in Manila and acquired a bachelor's  and master's degrees. At the University of Santo Tomas, he acquired his law degree in March 1893 while completing two-year work on literature and philosophy at the same time. Married to Mariquita Flores, he was the father of five children, including the decorated war veteran Jesus Antonio Villamor.

Career

Academe
He established the College of San Antonio de Padua in 1889, and he was his province's delegate to the Malolos Congress and participated in the drafting of the new Philippine constitution, particularly on the provision of universal education for all. Together with Enrique Mendiola, he co-founded the Liceo de Manila on June 29, 1900, where he was a professor and secretary.

Judiciary 
On February 16, 1901, he served as prosecuting fiscal of Pangasinan and then judge of the Court of First Instance of the sixth judicial district, which was composed of Cavite, Laguna, and Tayabas. He then was appointed as Solicitor General from July 17, 1906 to July 1, 1908 and appointed as Attorney General of the Philippines from July 1, 1908 to June 30, 1914.

Government
In 1913, Villamor became the Philippine Commission Executive Secretary of the Philippine Islands and director of the Bureau of Customs on 1918.

University of the Philippines
He was appointed the president of the University of the Philippines (UP) in 1915, becoming its first Filipino president when he replaced American Murray Bartlett. The school expanded during his term, adding new units like Conservatory of Music and opening the College of Education and the University High School. The Junior College of Liberal Arts in Cebu City was also established. Through the initiative of then Cebu Governor Manuel Roa who petitioned for its establishment on April 30, 1918, it was created by virtue of Act No. 2759 that was backed up by Speaker of the Philippine Commission Sergio Osmeña. When the college opened on July 1, 1918, its first registrar was Paulino Gullas with Dr. Lawrence Wharton as first dean.

Villamor was replaced by Guy Potter Benton as UP President.

Supreme Court
After his term at the University of the Philippines ended, he served as Associate Justice of the Supreme Court in 1921 and remained in the position until his retirement.

Author
Throughout his career, he had written several published works including Commentaries on the Election Law, Election Frauds and Their Remedies, and others.

Death
He died on May 23, 1933.

Publication
 Criminality in the Philippine Islands
 Commentaries on the Election Law
 Election Frauds and Their Remedies
 Japan’s Educational Development
 Slavery in the Philippines
 Industrious Men
 Ancient Filipino Writing
 The University of Santo Tomas in Her Third Century.

Historical commemoration
 Through City Ordinance No. 594 that was enacted on July 10, 1967, the Justice Ignacio Villamor Street, which stretches from Justice Abad Santos up to Gochan Subdivision, Barangay Kasambagan, Cebu City, was named in his honor.
Villamor Hall in University of the Philippines was named after him.

Further reading
 Rodriguez, Eulogio Balan. Ignacio Villamor: the Savant and the Man, Bureau of Print (1939)

References

1863 births
1933 deaths
University of Santo Tomas alumni
Colegio de San Juan de Letran alumni
Presidents of universities and colleges in the Philippines
Associate Justices of the Supreme Court of the Philippines
20th-century Filipino lawyers
People from Abra (province)